The Crucifucks is a self-titled debut album, released in 1985 on Jello Biafra's Alternative Tentacles record label. Although it never achieved commercial success, it has procured a cult following, most likely due to Doc Corbin Dart's uniquely shrill vocals and violent political lyrics. The album was later issued on the group's compilation album Our Will Be Done with "Wisconsin" and a bonus track from the band's original lineup. In recent times, Doc Dart has seemingly disowned the album, calling it "an abomination".

Track listing
 "Democracy Spawns Bad Taste" – 1:52
 "Go Bankrupt and Die" – 1:23
 "You Give Me the Creeps" – 1:03
 "Marching for Trash" – 1:45
 "Legal Genocide" – 2:29
 "I Am the Establishment" – 1:54
 "Cops for Fertilizer" – 1:48
 "Hinkley Had a Vision" – 2:12
 "By the Door" – 2:43
 "Oh Where, Oh Where?" – 1:10
 "I Was" – 1:25
 "Similar Items" – 2:32
 "Official Terrorism" – 1:27
 "No One Can Make Me Play Along with This" – 3:25
 "Down on My Knees" – 3:08

References

The Crucifucks albums
1985 debut albums
Albums produced by Spot (producer)
Alternative Tentacles albums